Ryme Intrinseca is a village and civil parish in northwest Dorset, England,  south of Yeovil and  west of Yetminster. It is sited on a low ridge of cornbrash limestone on the edge of the Blackmore Vale. The Intrinseca part of the name derives from the existence of the manors of Long Bredy and Langton Herring in the south of the county which also went by the name Ryme; that Ryme was known as Ryme Extrinsica but the name has long fallen out of use. In the 2011 census the parish had a population of 115.

The church at Ryme Intrinseca, which dates back to the 13th century, is dedicated to St. Hippolytus and there are only two churches dedicated as such in England: cf. St Ippolyts, a 
village on the southern edge of Hitchin in Hertfordshire. The chancel and nave of the church are basically from the 13th century, but architecturally the most interesting features lie in the unusual 17th-century work which includes the east window and most of the windows in the nave, (including the little trefoil placed high to light the pulpit). Also from the early 17th century is the tower, with its intricate profile caused by the projecting stairway. There is an alms dish in the church which was lost in 1873 and found its way back to Dorset from Bideford in Devon in 1938.

Ryme once constituted a separate liberty, containing only the parish itself.

See also
List of liberties in Dorset

References

External links

St. Hippolytus' Church

Villages in Dorset
Liberties of Dorset